Vladimír Hruška (born 2 August 1957) is a Czech football manager and retired player. He was also manager of the Czech Republic women's national football team.

Hruška played for Bohemians Prague for most of his career. He also had spells with RH Cheb, AS Angoulême and Chmel Blšany.

He played 3 matches for Czechoslovakia in 1986 FIFA World Cup qualification, scoring 1 goal.

Hruška was the last manager who led Bohemians Prague before it collapsed in the middle of the 2004–05 Czech 2. Liga season. In May 2005 he was unveiled as the new manager of another Bohemians team in Prague.

As manager of the Czech Republic women's national football team, Hruška was voted manager of the year for women's football at the 2010 and 2011 Czech Footballer of the Year (women) awards.

References

External links

1957 births
Living people
Czech footballers
Czechoslovak footballers
Czechoslovakia international footballers
FK Hvězda Cheb players
Bohemians 1905 players
Angoulême Charente FC players
Ligue 2 players
Czech football managers
Bohemians 1905 managers
Czech Republic women's national football team managers
Czechoslovak expatriate footballers
Expatriate footballers in France
Czechoslovak expatriate sportspeople in France
Footballers from Prague
Association football midfielders